The 2009 American Le Mans Northeast Grand Prix was the fifth round of the 2009 American Le Mans Series season.  It took place at Lime Rock Park, Connecticut on July 18, 2009.

The race was won by Simon Pagenaud and Gil de Ferran in the de Ferran Motorsports Acura, their third American Le Mans Series victory in a row.  Dyson Racing Team earned their first victory with Mazda in the LMP2 category, overcoming several mechanical issues during the race.  Flying Lizard Motorsports continued their season streak with their fourth consecutive win, while Gruppe Orange won in the ALMS Challenge category.

Corsa Motorsports also became the first American Le Mans Series competitor to utilize a hybrid electric drivetrain on their Le Mans Prototype during an event, eventually completing the race in third position.

Report

Qualifying

Qualifying result
Pole position winners in each class are marked in bold.

Race

Race results
Class winners in bold.  Cars failing to complete 70% of winner's distance marked as Not Classified (NC).

References

Northeast Grand Prix
Northeast Grand Prix
Northeast Grand Prix